Chan Gurney Municipal Airport  is a regional airport located three miles north of Yankton, in Yankton County, South Dakota.

History 
It is named for John Chandler Gurney, a native of Yankton who was a sergeant in the U.S. Army during World War I and later became a member of the United States Senate.

Facilities and aircraft 

United Express once flew Yankton to Minneapolis, Minnesota, and Denver, Colorado. North Central began Douglas DC-3 flights to Yankton in 1957–1958; successor Republic left about 1982 and Yankton dropped out of the OAG in 1989–1990.

AAA Airlines also served Yankton with non-stop flights to Sioux Falls, South Dakota, and to Norfolk, Nebraska.

External links 
City of Yankton - Chan Gurney Municipal Airport

References 

Airports in South Dakota
Buildings and structures in Yankton County, South Dakota
Transportation in Yankton County, South Dakota